Rabassa is a Catalan language surname. Notable people with the surname include:

Enric Rabassa, Spanish footballer and coach
Gregory Rabassa (1922–2016), American translator
Jorge Rabassa, Argentine geologist
Pere Rabassa (1683–1767), Spanish composer and musicologist

Catalan-language surnames